The 2016 United States presidential election in California was held on Tuesday, November 8, 2016, as part of the 2016 United States presidential election in which all 50 states plus the District of Columbia participated. California voters chose electors to represent them in the Electoral College via a popular vote, pitting the Republican Party's nominee, businessman Donald Trump, and running mate Indiana Governor Mike Pence against Democratic Party nominee, former Secretary of State Hillary Clinton, and her running mate Virginia Senator Tim Kaine. California had 55 electoral votes in the Electoral College, the most of any state.

Clinton won the state with 61.73 percent of the vote and a 30.11 percent margin. Despite being the largest state by population in the country, California only delivered Trump his third largest vote count, behind Florida and Texas. Even though Clinton lost the presidency, her victory margin in California was the largest of any Democrat since 1936. She also was the first Democrat to win Orange County since that same year.

Trump's 31.62% vote share remains the worst performance by a Republican presidential nominee since 1856.

Primary elections
On June 7, 2016, in the presidential primaries, California voters expressed their preferences for the Democratic, Republican, Green, and Libertarian, Peace and Freedom, and American Independent parties' respective nominees for president.

While California has had a top-two candidates open primary system since 2011, presidential primaries are still partisan races. Registered members of each party may only vote in their party's presidential primary. Unaffiliated voters may choose any one primary in which to vote, if the party allows such voters to participate. For 2016, the American Independent, Democratic, and Libertarian parties have chosen to allow voters registered with no party preference to request their respective party's presidential ballots.

Democratic primary

Seven candidates appeared on the Democratic presidential primary ballot:
Hillary Clinton
Bernie Sanders
Rocky De La Fuente
Henry Hewes
Keith Judd
Michael Steinberg
Willie L. Wilson

Opinion polling

Results

Republican primary

Five candidates appeared on the Republican presidential primary ballot, four of whom had suspended their campaigns prior to the primary:
Donald Trump
Ben Carson (withdrawn)
Ted Cruz (withdrawn)
John Kasich (withdrawn)
Jim Gilmore (withdrawn)

Donald Trump, the only candidate with an active campaign, won each Congressional district by substantial margins, as well as all the statewide delegates, to capture all 172 votes.

Libertarian primary

Twelve candidates appeared on the Libertarian presidential primary ballot:
Marc Feldman
John Hale
Cecil Ince
Gary Johnson
Steve Kerbel
John McAfee
Darryl Perry
Austin Petersen
Derrick M. Reid
Jack Robinson Jr.
Rhett Smith
Joy Waymire

The primary took place after Gary Johnson won the Libertarian nomination at the Party's 2016 convention.

Green primary

Other parties

American Independent

The American Independent Party,  a far-right and paleoconservative political party that formed when endorsing the candidacy of George Wallace in 1968 held a small presidential primary on June 7. It was won by attorney Alan Spears.

The American Independent Party nullified the results of this primary when they endorsed Donald Trump in August. The party indicated that Trump was a popular write-in choice during the primary, but was not allowed on the ballot because there was no evidence that Trump wanted the American Independent endorsement.

Peace and Freedom

General election

Polling

Democrat Hillary Clinton won every pre-election poll by double digits. The average of the last three pre-election polls showed Hillary Clinton leading Donald Trump 54.3% to 32%.

Statewide results

Below is an official list of California's Recognized Write-in Candidates. 

Laurence Kotlikoff for president and Edward Leamer for vice president
Mike Maturen for president and Juan Muñoz for vice president
Evan McMullin for president and Nathan Johnson for vice president
Bernie Sanders for president and Tulsi Gabbard for vice president
Jerry White for president and Niles Niemuth for vice president

California law only requires that 55 electors sign on to declare a person a write-in candidate, not that the persons consent, according to a statement from the Secretary of State's Office.

Results by county
Final results by county certified December 16, 2016.

Counties that flipped from Republican to Democratic
 Nevada (largest town: Truckee)
 Orange (largest city: Anaheim)

By congressional district
Clinton won 46 of the 53 congressional districts, including 7 held by Republicans.

Outcome by city 

Official outcomes by city.

Analysis 
California has voted Democratic in every presidential election since Republican George H. W. Bush won the state in 1988. Hillary Clinton easily continued the Democratic tradition in California, winning the state with 61.7% of the vote, Clinton's second highest vote percentage of any state, behind Hawaii. Donald Trump received 31.6% of the vote, making for a Democratic victory margin of 30.11 points. California was one of eleven states where Hillary Clinton outperformed outgoing President Barack Obama in 2012, and contributed to Clinton's national popular vote victory. 

The California state result was historically one of the most successful for the Democratic Party nominee by several measures, as Hillary Clinton carried California by the largest margin of any Democratic candidate since Franklin D. Roosevelt swept the state by 35.25% in his 1936 re-election landslide. Trump's 31.62% vote share in the state was the lowest for a major-party candidate in the state since John W. Davis's 8.2% in 1924. Trump became only the second nominee of either party to win the presidency without receiving at least a million votes in Los Angeles County, by far the nation's largest, since the county had first given any nominee over a million votes in 1952 (George W. Bush in 2000 having been the first).

California was the only large state (one with at least 15 electoral votes) in which Hillary Clinton lost no counties that had been carried by Barack Obama in 2012. Indeed, she herself flipped Orange County, the largest county to switch parties in either direction in 2016, into the Democratic column; no Democrat had carried Orange County since 1936, when Franklin Roosevelt carried every county in the state.  This made Donald Trump the first Republican to win the White House without carrying Orange County since the county's founding in 1889; he also became the first Republican to win the White House without carrying Ventura County since its founding in 1872, without carrying Riverside County since its founding in 1893, without carrying San Bernardino County since Ulysses Grant in 1868, without carrying Nevada, San Diego, or San Joaquin Counties since William McKinley in 1896, without carrying San Luis Obispo County since William McKinley in 1900, and without carrying Fresno, Merced, or Stanislaus Counties since Richard Nixon in 1968.

See also
 2016 Democratic Party presidential debates and forums
 2016 Democratic Party presidential primaries
 2016 Republican Party presidential debates and forums
 2016 Republican Party presidential primaries

References

External links
 RNC 2016 Republican Nominating Process 
 Green papers for 2016 primaries, caucuses, and conventions
 California neighborhood election results — A Los Angeles Times map of election results down to the precinct level

CA
2016
Presidential